The Cabinet of Liebe was created, as a result of Christian X's decision to dismiss the Second cabinet of Zahle, during the Easter Crisis of 1920. The cabinet was supposed to maintain control of the country until elections could be held. However, the dismissal of Zahle was widely unpopular and with the potential overthrow of the Danish crown, Christian dismissed Liebe, installing as a compromise Cabinet of Friis until elections could be held later that year.

List of ministers
The cabinet consisted of these ministers:

References

1920 establishments in Denmark
1920 disestablishments in Denmark
Liebe